This is a list of stops of the Trambaix, Trambesòs and Tramvia Blau tram services in Barcelona metropolitan area, alphabetically sorted:

List
{| class="wikitable"
|-
! Name
! Tram routes
! Other public transportation
! Municipality
! District
|-
|Adrià Margarit
|Tramvia Blau
|
|Barcelona
|Sarrià-Sant Gervasi
|-
|Alfons el Magnànim
|T5
|
|Barcelona
|Sant Martí
|-
|Auditori-Teatre Nacional
|T4
|
|Barcelona
|Sant Martí
|-
|Avinguda de Xile
|T1, T2
|
|Barcelona
|Les Corts
|-
|Avinguda Tibidabo
|Tramvia Blau
|L7
|Barcelona
|Sarrià-Sant Gervasi
|-	
|Besòs
|T5
|L4
|Barcelona
|Sant Martí
|-
|Bon Viatge
|T1, T2
|
|Sant Joan Despí
|
|-
|Bosch i Alsina
|Tramvia Blau
|
|Barcelona
|Sarrià-Sant Gervasi
|-
|Ca l'Aranyó
|T4
|
|Barcelona
|Sant Martí
|-
|Can Clota
|T1, T2, T3
|
|Esplugues de Llobregat
|
|-
|Can Jaumandreu
|T5
|
|Barcelona
|Sant Martí
|-
|Can Llima
|T4
|
|Sant Adrià de Besòs
|
|-
|Ca n'Oliveres
|T1, T2, T3
|
|Esplugues de Llobregat
|
|-
|Can Rigal
|T1, T2, T3
|
|L'Hospitalet de Llobregat
|District V
|-
|Carrer Número 15
|Tramvia Blau
|
|Barcelona
|Sarrià-Sant Gervasi
|-
|Central Tèrmica del Besòs
|T4
|
|Sant Adrià de Besòs
|
|-
|Centre Miquel Martí i Pol
|T2
|
|Sant Joan Despí
|
|-
|Ciutadella | Vila Olímpica
|T4
|L4
|Barcelona
|Sant Martí
|-
|Cornellà Centre
|T1, T2
|L5, Rodalies Barcelona
|Cornellà de Llobregat
|
|-
|El Maresme
|T4
|L4
|Barcelona
|Sant Martí
|-
|El Pedró
|T1, T2
|
|Cornellà de Llobregat
|
|-
|Encants de Sant Adrià
|T5
|
|Sant Adrià de Besòs
|
|-
|Ernest Lluch
|T1, T2, T3
|
|L'Hospitalet de Llobregat
|District V
|-
|Espronceda
|T5
|
|Barcelona
|Sant Martí
|-
|Estació de Sant Adrià
|T4
|Rodalies Barcelona
|Sant Adrià de Besòs
|
|-
|Fluvià
|T4
|
|Barcelona
|Sant Martí
|-
|Font del Racó
|Tramvia Blau
|
|Barcelona
|Sarrià-Sant Gervasi
|-
|Fontsanta i Fatjó
|T1, T2
|
|Cornellà de Llobregat
|
|-
|Fòrum
|T4
|
|Barcelona
|Sant Martí
|-
|Francesc Macià
|T1, T2, T3
|
|Barcelona
|Les Corts
|-
|Glòries
|T4, T5
|L1
|Barcelona
|Sant Martí
|-
|Gorg
|T5
|L2, L10
|Badalona
|
|-
|Hospital Sant Joan Despí - TV3
|T2, T3
|
|Sant Joan Despí
|
|-
|Ignasi Iglesias
|T1, T2
|
|Cornellà de Llobregat
|
|-
|Josep Garí
|Tramvia Blau
|
|Barcelona
|Sarrià-Sant Gervasi
|-
|Josep Maria Florensa
|Tramvia Blau
|
|Barcelona
|Sarrià-Sant Gervasi
|-
|La Catalana
|T5
|
|Sant Adrià de Besòs
|
|-
|La Farinera
|T5
|
|Barcelona
|Sant Martí
|-
|La Fontsanta
|T2
|Rodalies Barcelona
|Sant Joan Despí
|
|-
|La Mina
|T6
|
|Sant Adrià de Besòs
|
|-
|La Sardana
|T1, T2, T3
|
|Esplugues de Llobregat
|
|-
|Les Aigües
|T1, T2
|
|Cornellà de Llobregat
|
|-
|L'Illa
|T1, T2, T3
|
|Barcelona
|Les Corts
|-
|Lluís Muntadas
|Tramvia Blau
|
|Barcelona
|Sarrià-Sant Gervasi
|-
|Maria Cristina
|T1, T2, T3
|L3
|Barcelona
|Les Corts
|-
|Marina
|T4
|L1
|Barcelona
|Sant Martí
|-
|Montesa
|T1, T2, T3
|
|Esplugues de Llobregat
|
|-
|Numància
|T1, T2, T3
|
|Barcelona
|Les Corts
|-
|Palau Reial
|T1, T2
|L3
|Barcelona
|Les Corts
|-
|Parc del Besòs
|T5
|
|Sant Adrià de Besòs
|
|-
|Pere IV
|T4
|
|Barcelona
|Sant Martí
|-
|Pius XII 
|T1, T2, T3
|
|Barcelona
|Les Corts
|-
|Plaça Dr. Andreu
|Tramvia Blau
|
|Barcelona
|Sarrià-Sant Gervasi
|-
|Pont d'Esplugues
|T1, T2, T3
|
|Esplugues de Llobregat
|
|-
|Román Macaya
|Tramvia Blau
|
|Barcelona
|Sarrià-Sant Gervasi
|-
|Sant Feliu-Consell Comarcal
|T3
|
|Sant Feliu de Llobregat
|
|-
|Sant Joan Baptista
|T5
|
|Sant Adrià de Besòs
|
|-
|Sant Martí de Provençals
|T5
|L2
|Barcelona
|Sant Martí
|-
|Sant Roc
|T5
|L2
|Badalona
|
|-
|Selva de Mar
|T4
|L4
|Barcelona
|Sant Martí
|-
|Torreblanca
|T3
|
|Sant Just Desvern
|
|-
|Walden
|T3
|
|Sant Just Desvern
|
|-
|Wellington
|T4
|
|Barcelona
|Sant Martí
|-
|Zona Universitària
|T1, T2, T3
|L3
|Barcelona
|Les Corts
|}

See also
List of Barcelona Metro stations
List of Rodalies Barcelona railway stations
List of railway stations in Barcelona
Trambaix
Trambesòs
Tramvia Blau

External links
Trambaix at Trenscat.com
Trambesòs at Trenscat.com
Tramvia blau at Trensat.com

Trams in Barcelona
Barcelona
Tram stops
Tram
Tram stations